Burning the Daze is the third studio album by American singer-songwriter Marc Cohn, released in 1998 on Atlantic Records. The album peaked at number 114 on the Billboard 200 Chart.

Track listing
All tracks written by Marc Cohn, except where noted.

Personnel 
 Marc Cohn – lead vocals, acoustic guitar (1, 2, 3, 8, 11), percussion (1, 10), acoustic piano (4, 6, 7), backing vocals (4), tack piano (5), guitar (5), slide guitar (9)
 John Leventhal – keyboards (1, 2, 3, 5, 7, 10), guitar (1, 3, 4, 5, 7, 8, 10), bass (1, 2, 3, 7, 10), percussion (1, 2, 5, 7, 8, 10), harmonica (1), electric guitar (2), nylon string guitar (2), tamboura (2), glockenspiel (3), organ (4), mandolin (5, 7), backing vocals (5), horn arrangements (6), acoustic piano (8), melodica (8), high string guitar (11)
 Malcolm Burn – organ (6), percussion (6), backing vocals (8)
 Tom "T-Bone" Wolk – accordion (9), cittern (9),  bass (9)
 Jon Brion – harmonium (11)
 Bill Dillon – guitar (6)
 Larry Campbell – acoustic guitar (11)
 Mark Plati – bass (4, 5, 8)
 Toby Myers – bass (6)
 Shawn Pelton – drums (1-5, 7, 9), percussion (4)
 Aaron Comess – drums (6)
 Brady Blade – drums (8)
 Rodney Crowell – handclaps (5)
 Rick Depofi – tenor saxophone (1, 6), marimba (3), handclaps (5)
 Larry Farrell – trombone (6)
 Chris Botti – trumpet (1), flugelhorn (7)
 Peter Gordon – French horn (9)
 Jane Scarpantoni – cello (11)
 Patty Griffin – harmony vocals (1, 4), backing vocals (3)
 Catherine Russell – backing vocals (3)
 Martin Sexton – harmony vocals (3)
 Frank Floyd – backing vocals (4)
 Curtis King, Jr. – backing vocals (4)
 Kenny White – backing vocals (4), percussion (9)
 Rosanne Cash – harmony vocals (7)
 Darryl Johnson – backing vocals (8)

Production 
 Marc Cohn – producer (all tracks), engineer 
 John Leventhal – producer (1-8, 10), engineer, mixing
 Paul Samwell-Smith – producer (4, 9)
 Malcolm Burn – producer (6, 8), engineer
 Rick Depofi – engineer, assistant engineer
 Frank Filipetti – engineer, mixing
 Mark Plati – engineer, mixing
 Bob Clearmountain – mixing
 Kevin Killen – mixing
 Craig Bishop – assistant engineer
 Dante de Sole – assistant engineer, mix assistant
 Suzanne Dyer – engineer, assistant engineer
 Ken Feldman – assistant engineer
 Scott Gormley – assistant engineer
 Matt Knobel – assistant engineer
 John Bleich – mix assistant
 Jim Caruana – mix assistant
 Ryoji Hata – mix assistant
 James Saez – mix assistant
 Chris Theis – mix assistant
 Bob Ludwig – mastering
 Thomas Bricker – art direction, design
 Viktor Koen – illustrations
 Cynthia Levine – photography
 Frank Ockenfels – photography

References

Marc Cohn albums
1998 albums
Albums produced by John Leventhal
Albums produced by Paul Samwell-Smith
Albums produced by Malcolm Burn
Atlantic Records albums